Adhyan is a 2015 Indian Tamil-language romantic action film written and directed by Ram Manoj Kumar.

It has been dubbed into Hindi and was released as Daring Baaz ( Daring Man) on 30 May 2017 by Ad-Wise Media Digital.

Cast 
 Abhimanyu Nallamuthu as Adhyan
 Sakshi Agarwal as Anamika
 Jenish as Veeram
 Veerapandiyan
 Manheswaran
 Jayachandran

Production

Soundtrack

Release 
The Times of India Samayam gave the film a rating of two-and-a-half out of five praised the performance of newcomer Abhimanyu. Maalaimalar gave the film a rating of thirty-seven out of a hundred and praised the performances of the lead cast while criticizing the screenplay".

References 

2015 films
2010s Tamil-language films
Indian romantic action films
2010s romantic action films
2015 masala films